The International School of Iceland (abbreviated ISI; official name in Icelandic: Alþjóðaskólinn á Íslandi) is a private, non-profit school in Garðabær, Iceland. It is an international school in the Reykjavík area of Iceland, first established in 1960 as the American Embassy School. ISI has received support in the form of grants, training and consultation from the Office of Overseas Schools in Washington, D.C. since the 1960s.

History
Previously, the school was known as the American Embassy School and then Reykjavik International School in 2004 before taking on its present name in 2006. The school was located on Bergstaðastræti in Reykjavík (as the American Embassy School) and in Grafarvogur before finding its current home in Garðabær,  a municipality of the Greater Rekjavík area.

The International School of Iceland offers a course of study for students K-10. This means that ISI can serve students of primary, middle or high school age. After serving grades K-7 for many years, the school was expanded to include grade 8 in the 2015-2016 school year. Grade 9 was added during the 2016-2017 school year and most recently grade 10 was added to the curriculum in the 2017-2018 school year. This allows students to attend ISI for their entire grunnskoli career before moving directly to menntaskóli (secondary) education.

The school, constructed in 2005, is housed within the Sjálandsskóli building at Langalina 8, 210 Garðabær. Grades K-3 are housed in a second building next door, called Thorsmork.

Academics
The International School of Iceland offers two programs, or “streams.”  The English stream is for families whose parents have been temporarily assigned to work in Iceland by an embassy, business or university; typically, these families live in Iceland for 3 years or fewer. The Bilingual stream is intended for students who live in Iceland on a permanent basis or for an undetermined length of time.

The program includes English, Icelandic (Bilingual program only), mathematics, humanities, thematic units from the International Primary Curriculum, gym, swimming, art, textiles, theater and woodwork. Students in the English stream will learn Spanish as of 2014.

In addition to the academic program, ISI uses external assessments to measure student learning. MAP (Measures of Academic Progress) assessments were introduced at ISI in the fall of 2010. Students in the Bilingual program take the Icelandic National Exams (Samræmd próf) in mathematics and Icelandic in grades 4 and 7. These exams are administered each year in September.

Accreditation
In 2010, the school was audited by the Icelandic Ministry of Education. ISI is undergoing the accreditation process with the Council of International Schools (CIS). After a visit from CIS representative George Hobson in January 2015, ISI was given official membership status. In addition, ISI is a full member of ECIS (European Council of International Schools).

In 2017, ISI received joint accreditation with both CIS and MSA (Middle States Association of Colleges and Schools) organizations. Accreditation is an indication that the school offers an education of quality. It indicates the quality of our plan for the future and allows for closer links with other international schools. Colleges and universities worldwide acknowledge that an Accredited School meets internationally agreed upon and recognized standards.

Culture and traditions
School traditions include an annual berry picking trip, a tree planting field trip and a winter ski trip to Bláfjöll (weather permitting).  In May, students run to raise money for UNICEF.

Each year also brings a Halloween Party, holiday celebrations throughout the month of December, a pot-luck dinner in February and a Spring Event with themes that vary from year to year (e.g. 80s Night, Color Explosion or Masquerade).

In May 2014, the school hosted a celebration of its 10-year anniversary; guests included the Minister of Education, the  mayor of Garðabær, representatives from local embassies, and former and current students.

In the spring of each year, students in grades 5-6 raise money to go on an overnight trip in the Icelandic countryside. Grade 7 attends Reykir School Camp for a week of learning and fun.  Grades 8-10 go abroad to expand their learning.

Activities
In addition to the Academic program, the school offers students classes in swimming, gym, textiles, art and woodwork as part of a typical school day.

The school also offers after-school activities, including Photography Club and Art Club. Past offerings include computer coding, role-playing games and creativity, Mandarin Chinese Language, Spanish Language, Icelandic Enrichment, Football (Soccer) Club, Chess Club, Science Club and DJ Workshop.

References

External links
 
 ISI Official Facebook page
 ISI Official Parents Facebook Group

International schools in Iceland
Educational organizations based in Iceland
Educational institutions established in 2004
2004 establishments in Iceland
Private schools in Europe